George Douglas Freeth Jr. (November 8, 1883 – April 7, 1919) was an American life guard and swimming instructor. Freeth was referred to in his day as the first white person to become expert at wave surfing, although he was of part Native Hawaiian descent. He and fellow Hawaiian surfer Duke Kahanamoku introduced the sport to the United States.

Biography 

Freeth was born in Honolulu, Hawaii in 1883, his mother was part-Hawaiian while his father, George Freeth Sr., was an Irish sea captain. Further information taken from various descendants mentions that his mother was Elizabeth Kailikapuolono Green, daughter of William Lowthian Green and Elizabeth "Lepeka" Kahalaunani, a Hawaiian woman. Lepeka also conceived three daughters with Archibald Cleghorn, a well-known businessman of Honolulu. Cleghorn later fathered the well-known Princess Kaiulani with Hawaiian royalty Miriam Likelike, a sister to King David Kalakaua and Queen Liliuokalani.

While vacationing in Hawaii, industrialist Henry Huntington, saw Freeth surfing and quickly brought him to Redondo Beach, California in 1907 as an attraction showing off "the man who walked on water". According to the 1910 Census, Freeth rented a room at 106 Pacific Avenue in Redondo Beach.

Freeth died at the age of 35 as a result of the global flu pandemic in 1919 while living and working in San Diego.  According to his draft registration card a year earlier, Freeth was living at 1940 Abbott Street in San Diego and working as a lifeguard for the City of San Diego. Upon his death, he was buried in Oahu Cemetery in a grave with his sibling, A.R. Freeth.

Lifeguard contributions 
Freeth is credited by some with developing the rescue paddleboard and the rescue can, tools commonly used by lifeguards. However, the United States Lifesaving Association asserts that the rescue can was designed by Captain Henry Sheffield in 1897. 

In 1910, Freeth was awarded the Gold Lifesaving Medal for rescuing seven fishermen off Venice Beach during a winter storm in December 1908. The obverse of the medal shows rescuers in a small, storm-tossed boat pulling a man from the water, and the legend reads:
                                  UNITED STATES OF AMERICA
                                ACT OF CONGRESS JUNE 20, 1874
The legend on the reverse reads:
  IN TESTIMONY OF HEROIC DEEDS IN SAVING LIFE FROM THE PERILS OF THE SEA
And in the reverse center is inscribed:
  TO GEORGE FREETH FOR HEROICALLY RESCUING SEVEN FISHER-MEN

Theft of bust 
On August 7, 2008, it was reported that a bronze bust of Freeth was stolen from the Redondo Beach Pier where it was on display.  Police had no leads at the time, but suspected that the bust was stolen to be sold for scrap metal because of its copper content. On November 7, 2010, George Freeth's bust was replaced in Redondo Beach, CA.

Freeth's life and his contributions to surfing and lifeguarding is a significant part of the documentary film Waveriders.

References

External links
 surfline.com biography
 picklehead.com biography, from American Heritage Magazine
 The unheralded god who walked on water - The Independent
 "100 years of hanging ten" - A tribute in the Los Angeles Times
 Wave Riders - a documentary exploring Freeth's life and legacy
 Official copyright holder to the name George Freeth

1883 births
1919 deaths
American surfers
American people of Irish descent
Sportspeople from Honolulu
Deaths from the Spanish flu pandemic in California
American people of Native Hawaiian descent
Native Hawaiian surfers